This is a List of United States Air Force attack squadrons.

Attack squadrons

See also
49th Wing
432d Wing
926th Wing

References

Attack